A Past Unknown was an American Christian metal band from Cedar Falls, Iowa. They were known for playing  a metalcore style with a more melodic metalcore sound. The band started making music in 2009, and their members at the time were lead vocalist, Grant Lilly, guitarists, Nick Powell and Trevor Rozendaal, bassist, Dirk Wiese, and drummer, Adam Aalderks. When Aalderks left the band, Jack Van Gent became the drummer. The band released their first studio album, To Those Perishing, in 2011 with Red Cord Records. Their second studio album, Vainglory, was released by Red Cord Records, in 2012. They disbanded in the middle of 2013.

Background 
A Past Unknown was based in Cedar Falls, Iowa. Their members, at its inception, were lead vocalist, Grant Lilly, guitarists, Nick Powell and Trevor Rozendaal, bassist, Dirk Wiese, and drummer, Adam Aalderks. Aalderks left the band, and Jack Van Gent was named his replacement.

Music history 
The band commenced as a musical entity in 2009, with their first studio album, To Those Perishing, where it was released by Red Cord Records, on July 13, 2011. Their subsequent studio album, Vainglory, was released on October 9, 2012, with Red Cord Records. The band ceased as a musical entity, in April 2013. Over the years, the members would create new projects, with Nick Powell forming his own project. Vocalist Grant Lilley would go on to form Then It Ends with Dirk Wiese joining alongside former members of Dividing the Masses.

Members 
 Grant Lilly – lead vocals
 Nick Powell – guitar
 Trevor Rozendaal – guitar
 Dirk Wiese – bass
 Jack Van Gent – drums (2010–2013)
 Adam Aalderks – drums (2009–2010)

Discography 
Albums
 To Those Perishing (July 13, 2011, Red Cord)
 Vainglory (October 9, 2012, Red Cord)

References

External links 
Official website

2009 establishments in Iowa
2013 disestablishments in Iowa
Musical groups established in 2009
Musical groups disestablished in 2013
American Christian metal musical groups
Christian rock groups from Iowa
Metalcore musical groups from Iowa